Shea Joseph McAleese (born 7 August 1984) is a New Zealand field hockey player who competed in the 2008 Summer Olympics and 2012 Olympics.  He was part of the New Zealand team that won the bronze medal at the 2010 Commonwealth Games.

Youngest son of Dan and Margie McAleese. Has an older brother and sister, Jonathan and Aimee.

Shea McAleese played at Uhlenhorster Hockey Club in Hamburg from 2007 till 2009. With the Team he won the Euro Hockey League 2007–2008. He also helped his team to a second-place finish in the competition in the  2008–2009 Season, when they were defeated by HC Bloemendaal of The Netherlands. He represents the Uttar Pradesh Wizards in the Hockey India League. He has also coached the Central Mavericks team in New Zealand.

In August 2021, Shea McAleese announced his retirement from International Hockey.

References

External links
 

1984 births
Living people
New Zealand male field hockey players
Male field hockey midfielders
Olympic field hockey players of New Zealand
Field hockey players at the 2008 Summer Olympics
Field hockey players at the 2012 Summer Olympics
Field hockey players at the 2016 Summer Olympics
Field hockey players at the 2020 Summer Olympics
2006 Men's Hockey World Cup players
2010 Men's Hockey World Cup players
2014 Men's Hockey World Cup players
2018 Men's Hockey World Cup players
Commonwealth Games medallists in field hockey
Commonwealth Games bronze medallists for New Zealand
Field hockey players at the 2010 Commonwealth Games
Field hockey players at the 2014 Commonwealth Games
Field hockey players at the 2018 Commonwealth Games
Commonwealth Games silver medallists for New Zealand
Uhlenhorster HC players
HGC players
Expatriate field hockey players
New Zealand expatriate sportspeople in Australia
New Zealand expatriate sportspeople in the Netherlands
New Zealand expatriates in Belgium
New Zealand expatriate sportspeople in Germany
Sportspeople from Napier, New Zealand
Medallists at the 2010 Commonwealth Games
Medallists at the 2018 Commonwealth Games